is a Paralympic swimmer from Japan competing mainly in category S11 events.

Rina competed as part of the Japanese Paralympic swimming team at two Paralympics, firstly in 2004 and then again in 2008.  In 2004, she finished sixth in the 200 m individual medley, sixth in her heat in the 50 m freestyle, fifth in the 100 m freestyle heat, eighth in the final of the 100m breaststroke.  At the 2004 games she improved to finish second behind Qimeng Dong of China who swam a 100 m backstroke world record she also finished eighth in the 50 m freestyle and finished fifth in her heat of the 100 m freestyle.

References

External links
 

Year of birth missing (living people)
Living people
Japanese female breaststroke swimmers
Japanese female freestyle swimmers
Japanese female medley swimmers
Paralympic swimmers of Japan
Paralympic silver medalists for Japan
Paralympic medalists in swimming
Swimmers at the 2004 Summer Paralympics
Swimmers at the 2008 Summer Paralympics
Swimmers at the 2012 Summer Paralympics
Medalists at the 2004 Summer Paralympics
Medalists at the 2012 Summer Paralympics
S11-classified Paralympic swimmers
21st-century Japanese women